Haruna Olatunji Ilerika (27 October 1949 – 4 December 2008) was a Nigerian footballer. Native of Epe, Lagos state, Haruna  also attended Lagos city College  between  1967 and 1969. He  was the school captain and acting coach  in 1969 before he moved to Zumratul grammar school.

Career
Ilerika played for the Nigeria national football team between 1971 and 1976 and spent his entire career with Stationery Stores in Lagos.

He joined Stationery Stores FC in 1971 after a brief stint with the defunct Metal Construction Football Club (Apapa) after having led the Zumratul-Islamiya Grammar School, Surulere to victory in the 1970 Principals' Cup Football competition for secondary schools in Lagos State.

Nicknamed the "Master Dribbler", Ilerika wore the number 9 jersey while on the national team. His last game was in the final of the 1981 Cup Winners Cup where Stores lost to Cameroun's Union Douala 2-1 on aggregate. Chief Ilerika then moved on to the team's technical bench. At the time of his death, he was the Lagos State Football Association Vice-Chairman.

He died on 4 December 2008 at 59 aged.

References

External links

Adieu Haruna Ilerika (Guardian)

1949 births
2008 deaths
Nigerian footballers
Nigeria international footballers
1976 African Cup of Nations players
Sport in Lagos
Nigerian Muslims
Yoruba sportspeople

Association football midfielders